The Tenney Building is located in Madison, Wisconsin.

Description
The building is located directly across from the Wisconsin State Capitol. It houses a number of commercial interests, with the top nine stories serving as offices. The Tenney Building was added to the State and the National Register of Historic Places in 2017.

References

Office buildings on the National Register of Historic Places in Wisconsin
National Register of Historic Places in Madison, Wisconsin
Buildings and structures in Madison, Wisconsin
Art Deco architecture in Wisconsin
Commercial buildings completed in 1930